Våkenatt is an album by Bridges. The release features a-ha band members Magne Furuholmen and Paul Waaktaar-Savoy along with  Viggo Bondi and  Øystein Jevanord. It was recorded in Oslo between 1980 and 1981 and released in 2018.  Nine hundred numbered albums, pressed on green vinyl, were manufactured. This release includes a 16-page booklet 
Paul Waaktaar-Savoy said about this release:

References

External links 
Official a-ha website
 

2018 albums
Bridges (band) albums